Ahmad Alirezabeigi (born 1957 in Urmia) is an Iranian retired police officer and principlist politician who currently serves as member of the Iranian Parliament representing Tabriz, Osku and Azarshahr electoral district. He was governor of East Azerbaijan Province from 2008 to 2013 under President Mahmoud Ahmadinejad. He is Alumni NAJA University and Commander Law Enforcement Forces of Islamic Republic of Iran in East Azerbaijan and Isfahan Province. he maintained foreign relations between East Azerbaijan and governors of Erzurum, Istanbul, Baku and China. In 2013 after election of President Hassan Rouhani he replaced with Governor Jabbarzadeh. 

In 2015 he is elected as member of parliament from electoral district of Tabriz, Osku, and Azarshahr.

References

Living people
1964 births
People from Shabestar
Governors of East Azerbaijan Province
Members of the 10th Islamic Consultative Assembly
Members of the 11th Islamic Consultative Assembly
Popular Front of Islamic Revolution Forces politicians
Iranian police officers
Islamic Revolution Committees personnel
Iranian campaign managers